Anabel Medina Garrigues was the defending champion, but was defeated in the semifinals by Peng Shuai. Nicole Vaidišová won the title, defeating Peng in the final 7–6(9–7), 6–3.

Seeds

Draw

Finals

Top half

Bottom half

References

External links
Draws 

2006 Internationaux de Strasbourg Singles
2006 WTA Tour
2006 in French tennis